The following is a timeline of the history of the city of Bishkek, Kyrgyzstan.

19th-20th centuries

 1825 -  Built as one of 35 fortresses built in the region by Khokand to extend control over the Chu valley.
 1860 -  Conquered by a detachment of 600 Russians from Vernoe in a 7-day assault.
 1864 -  Became an important Cossack base and a regular relay point for the imperial mail service.
 1895 -  The city elected its first mayor.
 1926 -  The city became capital of the Kirghiz Autonomous Socialist Soviet Republic; Pishpek renamed "Frunze."
 1925 - Batratskaya Pravda newspaper begins publication.
 1938 - Botanical Garden founded.
 1954 - Frunze Polytechnic Institute founded.
 1965 - Population: 355,000.
 1974 - Vecherniy Bishkek newspaper begins publication.
 1975 - Manas Airport begins operating.
 1976 - Ala Archa National Park established near city.
 1979 - Population: 552,000.
 1984 - Ala-Too Square laid out.
 1985 - White House built.
 1990 - Kyrgyz Television begins broadcasting.
 1991 - City renamed "Bishkek."
 1992 - Dordoy Bazaar in business (approximate date).
 1993
 International University of Kyrgyzstan established.
 Jumabek Ibraimov becomes mayor.
 1995
 Boris Silayev becomes mayor.
 Population: 583,900 (estimate).
 1996 - International Atatürk-Alatoo University established.
 1998
 Felix Kulov becomes mayor.
 "Church in Bishkek" founded.
 1999 - The Times of Central Asia English-language newspaper begins publication.

21st century

 2001 - Manas Air Base of the United States military established outside city.
 2005
 24 March: Protest against Akayev regime.
 Arstanbek Nogoev becomes mayor.
 Institute for Public Policy founded.
 2006 - Protest against Bakiyev regime.
 2007
 Demonstration against Bakiyev regime.
 Daniar Usenov becomes mayor.
 2008 - Nariman Tuleyev becomes mayor.
 2009 - Population: 846,256.
 2010
 2010 Kyrgyzstani riots.
 Isa Omurkulov becomes mayor (approximate date).
 2011 - TEDx Bishkek begins.
 2016 -  becomes mayor.
 2017 - Turkish Airlines Flight 6491, a cargo flight with 4 crew members, crashes while attempting to land at Manas International Airport near Bishkek, killing the 4 crew members and another 34 on the ground, including 17 children, at Dacha-SU, a residential enclave near the airport.

See also
 Bishkek history (ru)
 List of mayors of Bishkek
 List of universities in Bishkek
 Other names of Bishkek

References

This article incorporates information from the Kyrgyz Wikipedia.

Bibliography

External links

Bishkek
Bishkek
Bishkek
Years in Kyrgyzstan